Nóra Varsányi (born 3 October 1991 in Debrecen) is a retired Hungarian handballer who played for Debreceni VSC in right wing position until 2020.

Achievements
Nemzeti Bajnokság I:
Silver Medallist: 2011

References

External links
 Nóra Varsányi player profile on Debreceni VSC Official Website
 Nóra Varsányi career statistics at Worldhandball

1991 births
Living people
Sportspeople from Debrecen
Hungarian female handball players